Pilodeudorix elealodes is a butterfly in the family Lycaenidae. It is found in the Democratic Republic of the Congo (Uele and Tshopo). The habitat consists of primary forests.

References

External links
Die Gross-Schmetterlinge der Erde 13: Die Afrikanischen Tagfalter. Plate XIII 66 a

Butterflies described in 1908
Deudorigini
Endemic fauna of the Democratic Republic of the Congo